Mohammad Hamrang (born 9 March 1984) is an Iranian football player of Saba Battery. He usually plays in the defender position. He was part of Iran national under-17 football team at 2001 FIFA U-17 World Championship.

Club career

Club Career statistics

 Assist Goals

References

Iranian footballers
Malavan players
Steel Azin F.C. players
Saba players
Zob Ahan Esfahan F.C. players
Living people
1984 births
Association football defenders
People from Rasht
Sportspeople from Gilan province